Meyna spinosa is a species of flowering plant in the family Rubiaceae. It has a world-wide distribution across tropical and subtropical regions mainly in E. Asia - India, Nepal, Bangladesh, Myanmar, Thailand, Cambodia, Laos, Vietnam.

Description

Meyna laxiflora is a deciduous, thorny, straggling shrub or small tree that can grow up to 5 metres tall. The fruits of the tree are yellow, subglobose berry around 20mm in diameter containing 4 - 5 hard seeds, and edible. It is also use as a medicine.

References 

Vanguerieae